Lucas Arnold and Tomás Carbonell were the defending champions but only Arnold competed that year with Luis Lobo.

Arnold and Lobo lost in the final 6–3, 6–4 against Gastón Etlis and Martín Rodríguez.

Seeds

  Martín García /  Mariano Hood (first round)
  Daniel Orsanic /  Sebastián Prieto (first round)
  Lucas Arnold /  Luis Lobo (final)
  Gastón Etlis /  Martín Rodríguez (champions)

Draw

References
 2002 BellSouth Open Doubles Draw

Chile Open (tennis)
2002 ATP Tour